Alfred "Al" Zeien was an American businessman who chaired the personal care brand Gillette.

Biography
Zeien was born on 25 February 1930 and grew up New York. His father was an immigrant from Luxembourg and his mother was from France. He studied naval architecture at the Webb Institute, Long Island and later attended Harvard Business School, where he completed his MBA in 1955.

He died on 18 February 2019. The Zeien Lecture Series at the Webb Institute is named after him.

References

1930 births
2019 deaths
American people of French descent
American people of Luxembourgian descent
Webb Institute alumni
Harvard Business School alumni
Businesspeople from New York (state)